NGC 36 is a barred spiral galaxy in the constellation Pisces. It is located about 221 million light-years (68 megaparsecs) away. It was discovered in October 25, 1785 by the astronomer William Herschel.

References

External links
 
 

Galaxies discovered in 1785
0036
Barred spiral galaxies
Pisces (constellation)
00106
000798
+01-01-043
17851025